Allgood–Bailey Stadium is an outdoor stadium on the campus of the Missouri University of Science and Technology in Rolla, Missouri. The stadium has a capacity of 8,000 and hosts Missouri S&T Miners football games and track and field competitions. It opened in 1967 and was known as Jackling Field until 2000, when it was renamed after football and basketball coach Dewey Allgood and benefactor Keith Bailey.

References

College football venues
Missouri S&T Miners football
Rolla, Missouri
American football venues in Missouri
College track and field venues in the United States
Athletics (track and field) venues in Missouri
Sports venues in Missouri